The 11th Michigan Infantry Regiment (Reorganized) was an infantry regiment that served in the Union Army during the American Civil War.

Service
The 11th Michigan Infantry (Reorganized) was organized at  Jackson, Michigan, and  mustered into Federal service between  January 4 and February 26, 1865.

The regiment was mustered out on September 16, 1865.

Total strength and casualties
The regiment suffered 96 enlisted men who died of disease, for a total of 96
fatalities.

See also
List of Michigan Civil War Units
Michigan in the American Civil War

Notes

References
The Civil War Archive

Units and formations of the Union Army from Michigan
1865 disestablishments in Michigan
1865 establishments in Michigan
Military units and formations established in 1865
Military units and formations disestablished in 1865